Éder Sciola Santana (22 September 1985) is a Brazilian football player who plays as a right midfielder or right defender for São Bento. He became known nationally in Brazil when his contract with São Paulo FC was terminated after trying to enter the club's accommodation with call girls.

Career

Started playing as a right back for Grêmio Barueri in 2003. In 2005 he was negotiated with Fluminense, where failed to consolidate in the team. Also passed through Inter de Limeira and Noroeste de Bauru after that.

In February 2008, he was loaned to São Paulo until the end of the year. However, his contract was terminated on September 29, after the unusual event listed above. Even so, he is considered by the club as the Brazilian champion of that year.

After going through other teams without success, in 2011, moved to Ituano to compete in the Campeonato Paulista. Drew the attention of Gil Vicente, from Portugal, where he played for 37 opportunities. The club where he stood out the most was in Brasil de Pelotas, on the Campeonato Brasileiro Série B.

Honours

São Paulo FC
Campeonato Brasileiro
Winners: 2008

References

External link

1985 births
Living people
Association football defenders
Association football midfielders
Brazilian footballers
Club Athletico Paranaense players
Gil Vicente F.C. players
Guarani FC players
Fluminense FC players
São Paulo FC players
Atlético Clube Goianiense players
Cuiabá Esporte Clube players
Paraná Clube players
Ituano FC players
Oeste Futebol Clube players
Grêmio Esportivo Brasil players
Sampaio Corrêa Futebol Clube players
Esporte Clube Noroeste players
Esporte Clube São Bento players
Primeira Liga players
Campeonato Brasileiro Série A players
Campeonato Brasileiro Série B players
Footballers from São Paulo